Deyl is a surname. Notable people with the surname include:

Miloš Deyl (1906–1985), Czech botanist
Radek Deyl (born 1989), Slovak ice hockey player
 (1876–1972), Czech actor
Rudolf Deyl Jr. (1912–1967), Czech actor, son of Rudolf